Earnest "Coach" Williams (born June 14, 1949) is an American politician. He is a former member of the Georgia House of Representatives from the 87th District, serving from 2002 to January 2019. He was defeated in the Democratic Primary by Viola Davis. He is a member of the Democratic party.

References

Living people
Democratic Party members of the Georgia House of Representatives
1949 births
People from Baker County, Georgia
21st-century American politicians